Janice Huff (born September 1, 1960) is the chief meteorologist for WNBC in New York City.

Early years
As she has sometimes noted on her newscast, though born in New York City, at an early age she moved to her grandparents house in Columbia, South Carolina, and graduated from Eau Claire High School with honors, where she was a member of the National Honor Society, Secretary of the Student Council, Varsity Cheerleader, and Miss Shamrock 1978.

Education
Huff graduated from Florida State University in Tallahassee, Florida with a major in meteorology. While at FSU, Huff joined Alpha Kappa Alpha sorority.
From 1982 to 1983, Janice was  a weekend meteorologist at WTVC, Chattanooga, Tennessee.

Career
In 1982–83, Janice was  a weekend meteorologist at WTVC, the ABC affiliate in Chattanooga, Tennessee.

In 1983, Janice was a meteorologist/science reporter at WRBL, Columbus, GA.

In 1985, Janice received the American Meteorological Society's Seal of Approval for Television Weathercasting.

In 1987, Janice began work as  an on-air meteorologist at KSDK, St. Louis, Missouri and covered the Crystal Apple awards there.

In April 1991, Janice went on to the NBC affiliate, KRON in San Francisco where she was an on-air meteorologist and hosted "Bay Area's Best Bets." While at KRON, Huff was also named a "Clean Air Hero" by the American Lung Association for her work in promoting cleaner air and healthier lungs.

In 1992, Huff introduced the nationally syndicated "Weather School" program to the Bay Area, which promotes science education with an emphasis on meteorology.

In January 1995, Janice joined WNBC as the weekend meteorologist for "Today in New York," "News Channel 4" at 6 and 11 p.m. In 2001 Janice added "Live at Five" to her duties.  She is the host of "Wednesday's Child," a weekly adoption feature that airs Wednesdays during "News 4 You" and again on "Sunday Today in New York."

In 1995, Janice became Meteorologist on Weekend Today for 8 years she appeared on Saturdays and Sundays, switching back and forth from time to time, switching to only  Sundays in 2009. Huff left "Weekend Today" on April 30, 2012 after 16 years.

From 1997 to 1998, Janice hosted a short-lived lottery game show called NY Wired, with emphasis on supporting computer labs for schools based on the money won. In the second season, Cheryl Washington replaced her as emcee.

Awards
Huff has received honors and awards for her work on "Wednesday's Child," the prestigious Administration for Children's Services' "2004 Golden Heart Award," the 2004 "Miracle Makers Media Award" for her commitment and dedication to helping New York City's Foster Care children and the Second Annual "Nicholas Scoppetta Award for Service to Children." She was cited in 2002 as a "Grad Made Good" by her alma mater, Florida State University and has also received the Police Athletic League's "2002 Woman of the Year Award," a 2000 YMCA "Champion For Youth" honor and the City of Hope's "Spirit of Life" award for her professional and personal example to New York City youth.

Her professional awards include Bronx Community College's 1995 "Kaleidoscope Award" for excellence in television meteorology; a St. Louis Emmy Award for "Best Weathercaster" (1988); and Huff is a member of the American Meteorological Society, the National Association of Black Journalists, the National Academy of Television Arts and Sciences, Alpha Kappa Alpha sorority, and the New York Friars' Club.

She was inducted into the New York State Broadcasters Hall of Fame in 2016.

Family & extras
Janice is currently married and resides in Denville Township, New Jersey. Janice takes time to mention her beloved FSU Seminoles whenever possible. Further, video footage of Janice Huff can be seen as part of the Radio City Christmas Spectacular. In the footage, Janice predicts that there is little chance of a White Christmas.

During 9/11, WNBC showed live via Chopper 4 the south tower of the World Trade Center exploded with immediate indication that it was an explosion. Minutes after the impact, it was Janice, who called the station from her home while watching the broadcast, that pointed out that she saw a plane flying low and hitting the tower from the chopper's vantage point. They replayed the footage of the impact with Janice commenting on it and confirmed that it was indeed a plane.

Janice voiced meteorologist Stormy Gale on the PBS Kids series Cyberchase and appeared as a guest on the show's Cyberchase For Real segment to explain fog.

See also
 New Yorkers in journalism

References

External links
 WNBC profile
 Eau Claire H.S, Columbia, S.C.

1960 births
Living people
Television anchors from New York City
Television anchors from San Francisco
Television meteorologists from New York (state)
Television meteorologists in New York City
New York (state) television reporters
Florida State University alumni
People from Columbia, South Carolina
People from Denville, New Jersey
Scientists from New York (state)